Dr. Shakuntala Misra National Rehabilitation University (DSMNRU)  is a state university located in Lucknow, Uttar Pradesh, India.

History 
Dr. Shakuntala Misra National Rehabilitation University was established by the Divyangjan Sashaktikaran Vibhag of the Government of Uttar Pradesh through an ordinance dated 29 August 2008, which was later replaced by U.P. Act No. 1 of 2009, dated 19 February 2009 and U.P. Act No. 24 of 2011, dated 28 November 2011.

Departments

The university has multiple faculties, including arts, commerce and management, computer and information technology, law, music and fine art, science and technology, engineering and technology, and special education.

References

Disability in India
Universities and colleges in Lucknow
Universities in Uttar Pradesh
Educational institutions established in 2008
2008 establishments in Uttar Pradesh